"Caroline" is the debut single by American hip hop recording artist Aminé. It was released on March 9, 2016, and was produced by Aminé himself and Pasqué. It serves as the lead single from his debut studio album Good for You.

Background
In an interview with Genius, Aminé said that:

The first time I heard the name "Caroline" was in OutKast's "Roses", so that was definitely an influence on me in general. But I wrote this song with the intentions of hopefully making a modern day "Billie Jean". Caroline represents the handful of women I’ve met in my life that I would put genuine effort in.

Music video
The song's accompanying music video premiered on June 1, 2016, on Aminé's Vevo account on YouTube. As of December 2020, it has amassed over 300 million views.

Charts

Weekly charts

Year-end charts

Certifications

References

2016 debut singles
2016 songs
Aminé (rapper) songs
Songs written by Aminé (rapper)
Republic Records singles